Mordellistena nigroapicalis is a species of beetle in the genus Mordellistena of the family Mordellidae. It was described by Píc in 1923.

References

Beetles described in 1923
nigroapicalis